Crime at Luna Park (Italian: Delitto al luna park) is a 1952 Italian crime film directed by Renato Polselli.

Plot
The singer Silvia is unwittingly involved in robberies and murders that lead to jail. Roberto believes the innocent and manages to make her release after having discovered and denounced the shady dealings in which it had fallen. Out of jail, Silvia marry Roberto.

Cast
 Franca Marzi as Silvia
 Olga Gorgoni
 Renato Baldini as Roberto
 Harry Feist as Massimi
 Dante Maggio
 John Kitzmiller
 Nico Pepe
 Beatrice Mancini

Notes

External links
 
 Delitto al luna park at Variety Distribution

1952 films
1950s Italian-language films
Italian crime drama films
1952 crime drama films
Italian black-and-white films
1950s Italian films